The Argentine national ice hockey team is the national men's ice hockey team of Argentina. They are controlled by the Argentine Association of Ice and In-Line Hockey, an associate member of the International Ice Hockey Federation (IIHF).

History
The Argentina men's national ice hockey team played its first game in February 2012 against Mexico in an exhibition game in Cuautitlán Izcalli, Mexico. Argentina lost the game 1–5. The following day, they played their second exhibition match against Mexico and suffered a wider loss of 1–10.

Pan American Ice Hockey Tournament 
Argentina has participated in all four editions of the Pan American Ice Hockey Tournament.

In the 2014 Pan American Ice Hockey Tournament, they recorded their first ever victory, defeating Brazil by a score of 5–3. They finished fourth after losing to Colombia in the bronze medal game, 9–1.

After disappointing performances in the 2015 and 2016 tournaments, in which the team finished near last place both times, Argentina obtained its first ever international ice hockey medal in the 2017 tournament. Argentina recorded the tournament's biggest ever win with a 26–0 score against Chile, before defeating Mexico's U23 squad 6–1 in the bronze medal match.

Amerigol competition

Amerigol LATAM Cup 
While the LATAM Cup is the only annual competition for Argentina, it is not an IIHF-sanctioned tournament, and therefore does not count towards Argentina's official international record.

In 2018, 2019, and 2021, Argentina participated in the LATAM Cup tournament hosted by the Amerigol International Hockey Association. Due to the COVID-19 pandemic, there was no 2020 edition of the tournament. The event is hosted at the Florida Panthers Ice Den in Coral Springs, Florida.

Argentina won against Brazil, Venezuela, and Mexico, before a semi-final elimination in 2018 and quarter-final eliminations in both 2019 and 2021. In the 2021 edition, Argentina was eliminated in double overtime by the eventual champions, Colombia.

2022 Amerigol LATAM Spring Classic 
In March 2022, Argentina won their first ever championship in ice hockey national team competition at the 2022 Amerigol LATAM Spring Classic in Dallas, Texas. Argentina was undefeated in this tournament. In the group phase, the team defeated Venezuela (11–3), recorded their first ever victory against Colombia (8–3), defeated Puerto Rico (4–2), and defeated Brazil (10–6). In the semi-finals, Argentina again defeated Venezuela (10–3), before winning the championship against Puerto Rico by a score of 6–3. The title win received significant mainstream press coverage in Argentina.

Tournament record

Pan American Tournament

Roster
Last roster update: September 1st, 2022 

Head coach:  Dicky Haiek

All-time record against other nations
As of 12 June 2017

See also
 Argentina men's national field hockey team (Los Leones)
 Argentina women's national field hockey team (Las Leonas)
 Argentina women's national ice hockey team

References

External links
 Argentina Ice Hockey - Website of Men's national team
 Argentine Ice Hockey - Instagram account of Men's national team
 Argentine Association of Ice and In-Line Hockey 
 Amerigol International Hockey Association

Ice hockey in Argentina
National ice hockey teams in the Americas
Ice hockey